Vladimir Natanovich Vinokur (born 31 March 1948 in Kursk) is a Soviet and Russian entertainer, humorist, singer and actor. People's Artist of the RSFSR (1989).

Early life
Vladimir Vinokur was born on 31 March 1948 in Kursk to Natan Vinokur (1919–1995), a builder of Jewish descent, and Anna Yulyevna (1922–2018), a teacher of Russian descent. His older brother, Boris (1944–2010), was an entrepreneur.

Career
In 1962, Vinokur was involved in the Artek camp, and won a singing competition, with his medal being given by Russian cosmonaut Yuri Gagarin.

In 1975, Vinokur became involved with the parody band Samotsvety.

Personal life
Vinokur is married to Tamara Viktorovna Pervakova, an actress and former ballerina. On 25 October 1985, Tamara gave birth to their only daughter, Anastasia, who later pursued a career as a ballerina.

References

1948 births
20th-century Russian male actors
20th-century Russian male writers
20th-century Russian male singers
20th-century Russian singers
21st-century Russian male actors
21st-century Russian male writers
21st-century Russian singers
Living people
Russian Academy of Theatre Arts alumni
Honored Artists of the RSFSR
People's Artists of the RSFSR
Recipients of the Order "For Merit to the Fatherland", 2nd class
Recipients of the Order "For Merit to the Fatherland", 3rd class
Recipients of the Order "For Merit to the Fatherland", 4th class
Recipients of the Order of Honour (Russia)
Recipients of the Order of the Red Banner of Labour
Russian humorists
Russian male actors
Russian male comedians
Russian male voice actors
Russian male writers
Russian producers
Russian radio personalities
Russian satirists
Russian television presenters
Russian theatre directors
Soviet male actors

Soviet male singers
Soviet male voice actors
Soviet producers
Soviet television presenters